Kenneth Mason (18 September 1881 – November 1974) was a Barbadian cricketer. He played in seventeen first-class matches for the Barbados cricket team from 1903 to 1926.

See also
 List of Barbadian representative cricketers

References

External links
 

1881 births
1974 deaths
Barbadian cricketers
Barbados cricketers
People from Saint George, Barbados